Bassam Hisham Ali Al-Rawi (born 16 December 1997) is a Qatari professional footballer who plays as a defender for Al-Duhail and the Qatar national football team. He was born in Iraq and naturalized to represent Qatar in the international level.

Personal life
Born in Iraq, Bassam was naturalized to represent the Qatar national team. Bassam's father, Hisham Al-Rawi, played for the Iraq national football team in the 1990s. Bassam attended school in Qatar before being admitted to the Aspire Academy.

International career

2019 AFC Asian Cup
Bassam was included in Félix Sánchez Bas' Qatari squad for the 2019 AFC Asian Cup in the United Arab Emirates. He made his first international goal on 9 January 2019 against Lebanon. On 22 January, he scored his second international and the winning goal for Qatar against his country of origin, Iraq, which helped his team reach the quarter-finals of the competition. His team would eventually conquer the Asian title for the first time.

Eligibility dispute
On 30 January 2019, soon after the 2019 Asian Cup semi-final tie between the UAE and Qatar, which Qatar won 4–0, the UAE Football Association lodged a formal appeal to the on the fact that Bassam did not qualify to play for Qatar on residency grounds of the Article 7 of the FIFA statutes, which states a player's eligibility to play for a representative team if he has "lived continuously for at least five years after reaching the age of 18 on the territory of the relevant association". It was claimed that Bassam had not lived continuously in Qatar for at least five years over the age of 18. On 1 February 2019, the AFC Disciplinary and Ethics Committee dismissed the protest lodged by the United Arab Emirates Football Association.

Career statistics

International

International goals
Scores and results list Qatar's goal tally first.

Honours
Al-Duhail
Qatar Stars League: 2017–18, 2019–20
Emir of Qatar Cup: 2018, 2019
Qatar Cup: 2018

Qatar
AFC Asian Cup: 2019

Individual
 AFC Asian Cup Team of the Tournament: 2019

References

External links
 
 
 Bassam Al-Rawi profile 1 and profile 2 at Kooora.com (in Arabic)
 
 Bassam Al-Rawi at WorldFootball.com

1997 births
Living people
Qatari footballers
Qatar international footballers
Qatar youth international footballers
Qatari expatriate footballers
Qatari expatriate sportspeople in Spain
Expatriate footballers in Spain
Expatriate footballers in Belgium
Qatari expatriate sportspeople in Belgium
Association football defenders
Aspire Academy (Qatar) players
Al-Rayyan SC players
Celta de Vigo B players
K.A.S. Eupen players
Al-Duhail SC players
Qatar Stars League players
2019 AFC Asian Cup players
Iraqi emigrants to Qatar
AFC Asian Cup-winning players
Naturalised citizens of Qatar
2019 Copa América players
2021 CONCACAF Gold Cup players
Sportspeople from Baghdad
2022 FIFA World Cup players